Umbral is derived from the Latin umbra, meaning "shadow". It is also the Spanish and Portuguese word for "threshold", and sometimes used as a surname in that language.

Umbral may also refer to:
Umbral calculus, the surprising similarity between seemingly unrelated polynomial equations and certain shadowy techniques used to 'prove' them
Umbral moonshine, a mysterious connection between Niemeier lattices and Ramanujan's mock theta functions
Francisco Umbral (1932–2007), a Spanish journalist, novelist, biographer and essayist